Elections to the 1st Russian State Duma were held on 12 December 1993. 449 members were elected, 225 of them by party lists and 224 in single-member constituencies.

By constituencies

By party lists 
Members elected both by party lists and by constituencies are not listed.

Agrarian Party

Communist Party

Yavlinsky-Boldyrev-Lukin bloc

Choice of Russia

Democratic Party

Liberal Democratic Party

Party of Russian Unity and Accord

Women of Russia

Notes

External links 
 List of members elected by constituencies, Central Election Commission of Russia
 List of members elected by constituencies, politika.su
 List of members elected by party lists, politika.su
 Factions and groups of the 1st State Duma, politika.su

References 

1st State Duma of the Russian Federation
1st